Isaac Isinde (born 16 April 1991) is a Ugandan footballer who currently plays for Hadiya Hossana as a centre-back. He started playing football at Jinja Senior Secondary School, an Eastern Uganda Sports giant; where he was a regular fixture.
He has won 4 Ethiopian Premier League titles and 2 Ethiopian FA Cups in his 5 years with Saint George.

Career history
Isaac has played club football for Iganga Town Council, Simba, Victors in Uganda, Saint George in Ethiopia, Buildcon F.C in Zambia, and TRAU FC in India.

Buildcon F.C
Isaac moved to Buildcon F.C after expiry of his contract with St. George of Ethiopia, a couple of days to the finals of Africa Cup of Nations where he was part of the Uganda Cranes, Isaac made his debut for Buildcon F.C against T.P Mazembe at Levy Mwanawasa stadium, Ndola, Isinde featured at right back. He made his debut in the Zambian league on 8 April 2017 against Real Nakonde F.C and the match ended in a draw of 0–0.

International career
Isinde played his first international game with the senior national team on 3 March 2010 in and against Tanzania (2–3), where he played the entire match. He has now been a regular in the national team set up since 2013 and at 25 years of age already has 55 caps to his name.

International goals
Scores and results list Uganda's tally first.

Honours
Saint George
Ethiopian Premier League (4): 2012, 2014, 2015, 2016

Uganda
CECAFA Cup:  2011, 2012

References

External links
  
 

1991 births
Living people
Ugandan footballers
Ugandan expatriate footballers
Uganda international footballers
Association football defenders
Simba FC players
Saint George S.C. players
Buildcon F.C. players
TRAU FC players
I-League players
2017 Africa Cup of Nations players
Ugandan expatriate sportspeople in Ethiopia
Ugandan expatriate sportspeople in Zambia
Ugandan expatriate sportspeople in India
Expatriate footballers in Ethiopia
Expatriate footballers in Zambia
Expatriate footballers in India
Hadiya Hossana F.C. players
Sportspeople from Kampala